Eriogonum lobbii is a species of wild buckwheat known by the common name Lobb's buckwheat or prostrate buckwheat. It is native to most of the mountain ranges of northern California and their extensions into Oregon and Nevada. It is found in a number of mountain plant communities.

The plant is named after William Lobb (1809–1864), the English plant collector.

Description

This is a low-lying perennial with a woody caudex spreading to about 40 centimeters in maximum width. It forms a patch of round, paddle-shaped, woolly, gray-green leaves one to twenty centimeters wide in rocky areas. Its inflorescence is rarely erect, instead drooping or extending parallel to the ground, rarely higher than 15 centimeters.

At the end of each prostrate stem is a puffy, woolly, rounded cluster of flowers. Each flower is less than a centimeter wide, petals united in a 5-fold cup, and may be cream to yellowish or pink with red stripes. On level ground the flowerheads surround the cluster of basal leaves; on a hillside they all droop downhill.

External links
Jepson Manual Treatment
Photo gallery

lobbii
Flora of California
Flora of Nevada
Flora of Oregon
Flora of the Cascade Range
Flora of the Great Basin
Flora of the Klamath Mountains
Flora of the Sierra Nevada (United States)
Natural history of the California chaparral and woodlands
Natural history of the California Coast Ranges
Flora without expected TNC conservation status